The Great American Conference sponsors championship events for 12 of its 13 sports. The football champion is the team with the best conference record.

Northwestern Oklahoma State and Southern Nazarene were provisional members and not eligible for regular season championships or postseason championship tournaments. Individuals were eligible for postseason honors and may compete in cross country and golf postseason championships but not eligible for titles.

Men's Cross Country

Champion
Team – East Central
Individual – Mickey Hammer, Southern Arkansas

East Central University placed three runners in the top four and all seven competitors finished inside the top 15 as the Tigers repeated as Great American Conference Men's Cross Country Champions.

Southern Arkansas' Mickey Hammer emerged as the individual champion, fending off ECU's Cale Eidson.

Runner of the Year
Mickey Hammer, Southern Arkansas

Freshman of the Year
Arturo Nava, East Central

Coach of the Year
Steve Sawyer, East Central

All-GAC Team
Mickey Hammer, Southern Arkansas
Cale Eidson, East Central
Arturo Nava, East Central
Austin Christian, East Central
Lajos Farkas, Harding
Andrew Leahey, Southern Nazarene
Victor Others, Southern Nazarene
Matthew Cumpian, Harding
Logan Green, Harding
Jonathan Ogan, East Central

Championships

Saturday, October 20Host: East Central University (Ada, OK)

Women's Cross Country

Champion
Team – East Central
Individual – Ewa Zaborowska, Harding

East Central won its first Great American Conference Women's Cross Country championship title as the Lady Tigers edged out 2011 champion Harding.

Harding sophomore Ewa Zaborowska dominated the race, winning by more than a minute to claim the individual title.

Runner of the Year
Ewa Zaborowska, Harding

Freshman of the Year
Kelsey Taylor, Harding

Coach of the Year
Steve Sawyer, East Central

All-GAC 1st Team
Ewa Zaborowska, Harding
Samantha Bartlett, East Central
ReGina Germaine, East Central
Kelsey Taylor, Harding
Andrea McKinney, East Central
Megan Johnson, Southern Nazarene
Virginia Ney, Southern Arkansas
Colleta Maiyo, East Central
Kelsey Grier, Southern Arkansas
Tammy Kim, Harding

All-GAC 2nd Team
Dallis Bailey, Harding
Katie Bruner, East Central
Rachel Roberts, Harding
Chelsey Dillon, Southwestern Oklahoma State
Taylor Scott, Southwestern Oklahoma State
Johanna Casey, Ouachita Baptist
Carissa Curtis, Southwestern Oklahoma State
Emily Hickey, Southwestern Oklahoma State
Minhuyen Nguyen, East Central
Carli Langley, Southern Arkansas

Championships

Saturday, October 20Host: East Central University (Ada, OK)

Women's Soccer

Champion
Southwestern Oklahoma State

Down a goal late in the Great American Conference Women’s Soccer Championship, top seeded Southwestern Oklahoma State pulled off a dramatic comeback with two goals in a three-minute span to stun Ouachita Baptist 2-1 to claim the tournament title.

Offensive Player of the Year
Josie Price, Southwestern Oklahoma State

Defender of the Year
Kira Bertrand, Southwestern Oklahoma State

Goalkeeper of the Year
Corey LaMoureaux, Southwestern Oklahoma State

Freshman of the Year
Ashlee Beitinger, Southwestern Oklahoma State

Coach of the Year
Mark Persson, Southwestern Oklahoma State

All-GAC 1st Team
F - Ashley Bradford, East Central
F - Sherri Collins, Southern Nazarene
F - Kelsey Visor, Southwestern Oklahoma
F - Samantha Nunez, Southwestern Oklahoma State
M - Taylor Marsh, Northwestern Oklahoma State
M - Bekah Stewart, Southern Nazarene
M - Josie Price, Southwestern Oklahoma State
M - Jessica Carbonara, Southwestern Oklahoma State
D - Margaret Glutz, East Central
D - Hannah Hatcher, Harding
D - Carrie Lieblong, Ouachita Baptist
D - Kira Bertrand, Southwestern Oklahoma State
GK - Corey LaMoureaux, Southwestern Oklahoma State

All-GAC 2nd Team
F - Jenna Taylor, Harding
F - Mallary Schaub, Southern Nazarene
F - Cori Kelly Southwestern, Oklahoma State
M - Katie Glutz, East Central
M - Lauren Hatch, Ouachita Baptist
M - Kayla Thompson, Southern Nazarene
M - Ashlee Beitinger, Southwestern Oklahoma State
D - Carla Rodriguez, East Central
D - Cathy Wabenga, Northwestern Oklahoma State
D - Rachel Atnip, Southern Nazarene
D - Sara Eguren, Southern Nazarene
D - Ericka Ramirez, Southern Nazarene
GK - Shelby Shepherd, Ouachita Baptist
GK - Caitlin Thorpe, Northwestern Oklahoma State

All-GAC Honorable Mention
GK - Yoli Zamarripa, Southern Nazarene

Standings

Tournament

Friday-Sunday, November 2–4Host: Southwestern Oklahoma State University (Weatherford, OK)

All-Tournament Team
Jessica Carbonara, Southwestern Oklahoma State (Most Valuable Player)
Kira Bertrand, Southwestern Oklahoma State
Natalie Crosslin, Southwestern Oklahoma State
Kelsey Visor, Southwestern Oklahoma State
Josie Price, Southwestern Oklahoma State
Carrie Lieblong, Ouachita Baptist
Lauren Hatch, Ouachita Baptist
Mary Whisenhunt, Ouachita Baptist
Lauren Scharf, Harding
Hannah Hatcher, Harding
Andi Reagan, East Central
Mollie Hummel, East Central

Volleyball

Champion
Harding

One year after losing to Arkansas Tech in the Great American Conference Volleyball Championship final, Harding reversed its fate with a resounding four-set victory Saturday at the Rhodes Field House. After splitting the first two sets, the Lady Bisons won going away, 25-12 in the third set and 25-16 in the final set.

Like in their final regular season meeting, Arkansas Tech started strong and took the first set.

Player of the Year
Mollie Arnold, Harding

Newcomer of the Year
Denise De Vine, Southern Arkansas

Freshman of the Year
Megan Kunkel, Southeastern Oklahoma State

Coach of the Year
Meredith Fear, Harding

All-GAC 1st Team
S - Amber Cerrillos, Arkansas Tech
MB - Sara Motsinger, Arkansas Tech
OH - Carly Florian, Arkansas Tech
MB - Brittany Ryan, Arkansas Tech
MB - Tatiana Booth, East Central
OH - Mollie Arnold, Harding
S - Amber Schinzing, Harding
OH - Denise De Vine, Southern Arkansas

All-GAC 2nd Team
OH - Amy Kleypas, Arkansas-Monticello
MB - Liv Savage, Harding
MB - Alyssa Short, Harding
OH - Ty Lindberg, Henderson State
L - Allison Frizzell, Ouachita Baptist
OP - Emily Gentle, Southeastern Oklahoma State
L - Lauren Woods, Southern Arkansas
MB - Alison Cole, Southwestern Oklahoma State

All-GAC Honorable Mention
L - Allison Beardsley, Arkansas-Monticello
OH - Kaitlyn White, Arkansas Tech
OP - Bailee Graham, Harding
MB - Jessica Moss, Henderson State
MB - Megan Askew, Ouachita Baptist
OP - Abby Pickett, Ouachita Baptist
OH - Megan Kunkel, Southeastern Oklahoma State
S - Madelynne Cera, Southeastern Oklahoma State
OP - Courtney Smith, Southern Arkansas
S - Klaire Blasco Vine, Southern Arkansas
OH - Natalia Oliveira, Southern Nazarene
S - Lindsay Dusin, Southwestern Oklahoma State

Standings

Tournament

Thursday-Saturday, November 15–17Host: Harding University (Searcy, AR)

All-Tournament Team
Mollie Arnold, Harding (Most Valuable Player)
Amber Schinzing, Harding
Bailee Graham, Harding
Amber Cerrillos, Arkansas Tech
Morgan McKellar, Arkansas Tech
Lindsay Dusin, Southwestern Oklahoma State
Denise De Vine, Southern Arkansas

References

External links

Great American Conference